The Welsh Ladies' Amateur Championship is the women's national amateur match play golf championship of Wales. It was first played in 1905 and is currently organised by Wales Golf.

The Welsh Ladies' Amateur Championship is contested in two phases. It begins with a 36 hole stroke play competition, with the leading 16 competitors progressing to the knock-out match play competition.

It is a close event, entry being restricted to women who were either born in Wales, had one parent or grandparent born in Wales, or have resided in Wales for two years, if under 18, or for three years, if 18 or over. In addition players must not have played in the ladies closed championship of another country within the last two years or have ever played in the full international team of another country.

Winners

Source:

References

External links
Wales Golf

Amateur golf tournaments in the United Kingdom
Golf tournaments in Wales
1905 establishments in Wales
Recurring sporting events established in 1905